Ben Loader (born 8 November 1998) is an English professional rugby union player who plays as a wing for London Irish. His younger brother,  Danny Loader, is a professional footballer.

Loader has represented England at U20 level and was called up to a representative squad to face The Barbarians in June 2019.

Personal life
Born in England, Loader is of Cameroonian descent through his mother.

References

Living people
1998 births
London Irish players
English rugby union players
Rugby union wings
Rugby union players from Reading, Berkshire
English people of Cameroonian descent